The Luzon striped babbler (Zosterornis striatus) is a species of bird in the family Zosteropidae. It is endemic to the Philippines, where it is only found in northern Luzon and in Bataan.

Its natural habitat is tropical moist lowland forest. It is threatened by habitat loss.

Description 

EBird describes the bird as "A fairly small bird. Rufous-brown on the wings, back, and tail, with a gray head, heavily-streaked pale underparts, and a black face and moustache stripe. Often found in mixed-species flocks. Somewhat similar to Stripe-headed rhabdornis and Grand rhabdornis, but smaller, with a white eye-ring rather than a black band through the eye. Voice includes a loud rattling trill and various quiet chips and squeals."

Habitat and Conservation Status
It is found in lowland and foothill forest and overgrown disturbed areas on Luzon. It also persists in heavily degraded forest and overgrown clearings. It is primarily a bird of forest floor and understorey, although it is sometimes also found in the middle and upper storeys. It mainly occupies forest below 500 m, although in the Sierra Madre it is locally common up to 1,000 m. Interestingly, compared with the other striped babblers (Panay striped babbler, Palawan striped babbler and Negros striped babbler), which are all mid to high elevation species, the Luzon striped babbler is seen in lower lying areas.   

IUCN has assessed this bird as least concern with the population believed to be on the decline. This species' main threat is habitat loss with wholesale clearance of forest habitats as a result of logging, agricultural conversion and mining activities occurring within the range. 

There are currently no targeted conservation plans for the species. It does occur in the protected area of Northern Sierra Madre Natural Park but protection and enforcement from loggers and hunters is still lax.

References

Collar, N. J. & Robson, C. 2007. Family Timaliidae (Babblers)  pp. 70 – 291 in; del Hoyo, J., Elliott, A. & Christie, D.A. eds. Handbook of the Birds of the World, Vol. 12. Picathartes to Tits and Chickadees. Lynx Edicions, Barcelona.

Luzon striped babbler
Birds of Luzon
Luzon striped babbler
Taxonomy articles created by Polbot